Martin Emmrich and Andreas Siljeström were the defending champions, but they chose to not compete this year.
Third seeds Rik de Voest and Izak van der Merwe won in the final 6–1, 6–4, against Alex Bogomolov Jr. and Alex Kuznetsov.

Seeds

Draw

Draw

References
 Doubles Draw

Knoxville Challenger - Doubles
2010 Doubles